Anchor  is a 2022 South Korean mystery-thriller film directed by Jung Ji-yeon starring Chun Woo-hee, Shin Ha-kyun and Lee Hye-young. It was released on April 20, 2022.

Synopsis 
A mysterious informant calls Se-ra, a signboard anchor of a broadcasting station, asking her to investigate directly saying that she (the informant) will be killed.

Cast 
 Chun Woo-hee as Jung Se-ra, the main anchor of a broadcasting station.
 Shin Ha-kyun as In-ho, a doctor and the spirit of a dead informant who leads Se-ra into greater chaos.
 Lee Hye-young as Lee So-jeong, Se-ra's mother who is obsessed with her daughter's main news anchor position.
 Cha Rae-hyung as Min Ki-tae
 Park Ji-hyun as Seo Seung-ah
 Nam Moon-cheol as head of the news agency
 Im Seong-jae as Detective Kim
 Kim Young-pil as Heo Ki-jeong
 Hae- Woon  Hae as Reporter Han
 Jung Soon-won as PD Choi
 Park Se-hyeon as Yoon Mi-so
 Seo Yi-soo as Yuna
 Kim Young-ah as Professor Han Young-ok
 Eun-sol as an female anchor

Production 
Casting was confirmed in September 2019 and filming began on November 9, 2019.

References

External links
  
 
 
 

2022 thriller films
2022 films
2020s Korean-language films
South Korean mystery thriller films
Films set in 2019
Films about dissociative identity disorder
Films about the media
Films about television
Films about television people
Films about journalists
Films about hypnosis
Films about mother–daughter relationships